The highest-selling albums and mini-albums in Japan are ranked in the Oricon Weekly Chart, published by Oricon Style magazine. The data are compiled by Oricon based on each album's weekly physical sales. Thirty-seven albums reached the peak of the chart in 2008.

R&B singer Namie Amuro's Best Fiction had the longest chart run of 2008. The album remained at the top of the charts from its issue date of August 11 to September 15. Amuro became the first solo female artist in 28 years to have an album chart number one for six consecutive weeks after , who had an album at number one for seven consecutive weeks in 1980. Pop singer Mariya Takeuchi's greatest hits album Expressions stayed atop the charts for three consecutive weeks, making her the first artist over 50 years of age to accomplish this. Other artists who had extended runs on the chart include Kobukuro, Kumi Koda, Exile, Madonna, Superfly, Greeeen, and Mr. Children; each spent two straight weeks on the chart.

Korean pop singer BoA's Japanese album The Face debuted at number one, making her the second artist after Ayumi Hamasaki to have six consecutive number-one studio albums since her debut. American pop singer Madonna is the only Western act to reach number one during 2008 with her eleventh studio album, Hard Candy. It became the singer's first album in 18 years to debut at number one on the Oricon chart. With the release of their second album, Game, girl group Perfume became the second technopop group (after Yellow Magic Orchestra) to have a number-one album on the charts.

B'z The Best "Ultra Pleasure" was hard rock duo B'z's 22nd number-one album, surpassing Yumi Matsutoya for having the most number-one albums. Their record increased to 23 number-one albums with the release of B'z The Best "Ultra Treasure". Rock singer Yui's B-side album My Short Stories debuted atop the charts, making her the second female artist after Seiko Matsuda to have a B-side album debut at the top.

The best-selling album overall of 2008 was R&B group Exile's Exile Love, released in late 2007, which sold over 1,470,000 copies. The second-best-selling album was Amuro's Best Fiction, which sold more than 1,447,000 copies, followed by pop folk band Kobukuro's 5296, with nearly 1,405,000 albums sold. The fourth- and fifth-best-selling albums were Exile Catchy Best and Heart Station by Exile and pop singer Hikaru Utada respectively. Exile Catchy Best sold over 1,222,000 copies, while Heart Station sold a little over 997,000 copies.

Chart history

See also
2008 in music

References

Number-one albums
Japan
2008